Amanullah Khan (1892–1960) was the ruler of Afghanistan, 1919–1929.

Amanullah Khan is also the name of:

Amanullah Khan (Herat leader) (died 2006), Afghan Pashtun who challenged the authority of Governor Ismail Khan
Amanullah Khan Jadoon, Pakistani politician
Amanullah Khan Zadran or just Amanullah Zadran, former Taliban leader, Pashtun, Afghan Minister of Border and Tribal Affairs 2001–2002
Amanullah Khan (umpire) (1933–2005), Pakistani cricket umpire
Amanullah Khan (comedian) (born 1950), Pakistani actor, producer and writer
Amanullah Khan (JKLF) (1934–2016), Kashmiri separatist
Amanullah Khan (Indian politician) (1950–2002),  politician in Hyderabad Old City
Amanullah Khan (Bangladeshi politician), Bangladesh Awami League politician